In Palamite theology, there is a distinction between the essence (ousia) and the energies (energeia) of God. It was first formulated by Gregory Palamas (1296–1359) as part of his defense of the Athonite monastic practice of hesychasmos against the charge of heresy brought by the humanist scholar and theologian Barlaam of Calabria.

In layman's terms, God's essence is distinct from God's energies in the same manner as the Sun's essence and energies are distinct.  The Sun's essence is a ball of burning gas, while the Eastern Orthodox hold that God's essence is incomprehensible. As the Sun's essence is certainly unapproachable and unendurable, so the Eastern Orthodox hold of God's essence. As the sun's energies on Earth, however, can be experienced and are evidenced by changes that they induce (ex. melting, hardening, growing, bleaching, etc.), the same is said of God's energies—though perhaps in a more spiritual sense (ex. melting of hearts or strength, hardening of hearts, spiritual growth, bleaching to be "white as snow," though more physical and psychological manifestations occur as well as in miracles, and inspiration, etc.). The important points being made are that while God is unknowable in His essence, He can be known (i.e. experienced) in His energies, and such experience changes neither who or what God is nor who or what the one experiencing God is.  Just as a plant does not become the Sun simply because it soaked up the light and warmth and grew, nor does a person who soaks up the warmth and light of God and spiritually grows ever become God—though such may be called a child of God or "a god."

Eastern Orthodox theologians generally regard this distinction as a real distinction, and not just a conceptual distinction. Historically, Western Christian thought, since the time of the Great Schism, has tended to reject the essence–energies distinction as real in the case of God, characterizing the view as a heretical introduction of an unacceptable division in the Trinity and suggestive of polytheism.

Historical background

The essence–energy distinction was formulated by Gregory Palamas of Thessaloniki (1296–1359), as part of his defense of the Athonite monastic practice of hesychasmos, the mystical exercise of "stillness" to facilitate ceaseless inner prayer and noetic contemplation of God, against the charge of heresy brought by the humanist scholar and theologian Barlaam of Calabria. According to catholic-church.org,

The mystagogical teachings of hesychasm were approved in the Eastern Orthodox Church by a series of local Hesychast councils in the 14th century, and Gregory's commemoration during the liturgical season of Great Lent is seen as an extension of the Sunday of Orthodoxy.

Eastern Orthodox views

Essence and energy
In Eastern Orthodox theology God's essence is called ousia, "all that subsists by itself and which has not its being in another", and is distinct from his energies (energeia in Greek, actus in Latin) or activities as actualized in the world.

The ousia of God is God as God is. The essence, being, nature and substance  of God as taught in Eastern Christianity is uncreated, and cannot be comprehended in words. According to Lossky, God's ousia is "that which finds no existence or subsistence in another or any other thing". God's ousia has no necessity or subsistence that needs or is dependent on anything other than itself.

It is the energies of God that enable us to experience something of the Divine, at first through sensory perception and then later intuitively or noetically. As St John Damascene states in Chapter 4 of An Exact Exposition of the Orthodox Faith, "all that we say positively of God manifests not his nature but the things about his nature."

Distinction between essence and energy

Real distinction
According to Fr. John Romanides, Palamas considers the distinction between God's essence and his energies to be a "real distinction", as distinguished from the Thomistic "virtual distinction" and the Scotist "formal distinction". Romanides suspects that Barlaam accepted a "formal distinction" between God's essence and his energies. Other writers agree that Palamas views the distinction between the divine essence and the divine energies as "real".

According to Vladimir Lossky of the neopatristic school, if we deny the real distinction between essence and energy, we cannot fix any clear borderline between the procession of the divine persons (as existences and/or realities of God) and the creation of the world: both the one and the other will be equally acts of the divine nature (strictly uncreated from uncreated). The being and the action(s) of God then would appear identical, leading to the teaching of pantheism.

Modern interpretation
Some contemporary scholars argue against describing Palamas's essence–energies distinction in God as a metaphysically "real" distinction. Orthodox philosophical theologian David Bentley Hart expresses doubt "that Palamas ever intended to suggest a real distinction between God's essence and energies." G. Philips argues that Palamas's distinction is not an "ontological" distinction but, rather, analogous to a "formal distinction" in the Scotist sense of the term. According to Dominican Catholic theological historian Fr. Aidan Nichols, Palamas's essence–energies distinction is not a mere "formal" distinction "demanded by the limited operating capacities of human minds".

According to Anna N. Williams's study of Palamas, which is more recent than the assessments of Hart and Philips, in only two passages does Palamas state explicitly that God's energies are "as constitutively and ontologically distinct from the essence as are the three Hypostases," and in one place he makes explicit his view, repeatedly implied elsewhere, that the essence and the energies are not the same; but Williams contends that not even in these passages did Palamas intend to argue for an "ontological or fully real distinction," and that the interpretation of his teaching by certain polemical modern disciples of his is false.

Eastern Orthodox criticism of Western theology

Eastern Orthodox theologians have criticized Western theology, especially the traditional scholastic claim that God is actus purus, for its alleged incompatibility with the essence–energies distinction. Christos Yannaras writes, "The West confuses God's essence with his energy, regarding the energy as a property of the divine essence and interpreting the latter as "pure energy" (actus purus)" According to George C. Papademetriou, the essence–energies distinction "is contrary to the Western confusion of the uncreated essence with the uncreated energies and this is by the claim that God is Actus Purus".

Catholic perspectives
The Catholic Church distinguishes between doctrine, which is single and must be accepted by Catholics, and theological elaborations of doctrine, about which Catholics may legitimately disagree. With respect to the Eastern and Western theological traditions, the Catholic Church recognizes that, at times, one tradition may "come nearer to a full appreciation of some aspects of a mystery of revelation than the other, or [express] it to better advantage."  In these situations, the Church views the various theological expressions "often as mutually complementary rather than conflicting."

According to Meyendorff, from Palamas's time until the twentieth century, Roman Catholic theologians  generally rejected the idea that there is in God a real essence–energies distinction. In their view, a real distinction between the essence and the energies of God contradicted the teaching of the First Council of Nicaea on divine unity. Catholic theologian Ludwig Ott held that an absence of real distinction between the attributes of God and God's essence is a dogma of the Catholic Church.

In contrast, Jürgen Kuhlmann argues that the Catholic Church never judged Palamism to be heretical, adding that Palamas did not consider that the distinction between essence and energies in God made God composite. According to Kuhlmann, "the denial of a real distinction between essence and energies is not an article of Catholic faith".

According to Meyendorff, the later twentieth century saw a change in the attitude of Roman Catholic theologians to Palamas, a "rehabilitation" of him that has led to increasing parts of the Western Church considering him a saint, even if uncanonized. Some Western scholars maintain that there is no conflict between the teaching of Palamas and Catholic thought on the distinction. According to G. Philips, the essence–energies distinction of Palamas is "a typical example of a perfectly admissible theological pluralism" that is compatible with the Roman Catholic magisterium. Jeffrey D. Finch claims that "the future of East-West rapprochement appears to be overcoming the modern polemics of neo-scholasticism and neo-Palamism". Some Western theologians have incorporated the essence–energies distinction into their own thinking.

Protestant views

Kierkegaard and the relationship to existentialism

The Danish Lutheran philosopher Søren Kierkegaard, widely considered the father of existentialism, expressed (pseudonymously as Anti-Climacus) in his 1846 book Concluding Unscientific Postscript to Philosophical Fragments an approach to God which holds that the Father's hypostasis (existence) has logical primacy over his ousia (essence or substance). Hence the teaching that the core of existentialist philosophy can be understood as the maxim, "existence precedes essence." This has caused many Western observers to see Eastern Orthodox Christian theology as existentialistic (since the Essence–Energies distinction also somewhat holds the view). This also accounts for other existentialist works, such as Fyodor Dostoevsky's 1864 novel Notes from Underground. In the case of Dostoevsky, his existentialist outlook would have drawn from his Russian Orthodox faith, but there is no record of Dostoevsky (and the Eastern Orthodox church in general) being exposed to or influenced by Kierkegaard's philosophical works.

See also 
Orthodox theology
 Deification (theosis) and synergy
 Uncreated Light
 Cappadocian Fathers
 Pseudo-Dionysius the Areopagite
 Byzantine philosophy
Neo-Palamism
 Vladimir Lossky
 Sophrony (Sakharov)
 John Meyendorff
Stochastics
 Stochastics
 Pavel Florensky
Western philosophy
 Plethon
 Heidegger
 Noumenon
Asia
 Bhedabheda
 Essence-Function
 Brahman and Atman division
 Shakti
Judaism
 Atzmus and Ohr
 Ein Sof

Notes

References

Bibliography

 
Vladimir Lossky The Mystical Theology of the Eastern Church, SVS Press, 1997. James Clarke & Co. Ltd., 1991. Google books
David Bradshaw Aristotle East and West: Metaphysics and the Division of Christendom Cambridge University Press, 2004 ,  Google books

External links
Theoria, Prayer and Knowledge by Dr M.C. Steenberg Theology and Patristics University of Oxford
"Orthodox Psychotherapy" by Metropolitan Hierotheos of Nafpaktos
Excerpt from "Byzantine Theology, Historical trends and doctrinal themes" by John Meyendorff
Partial copy of V. Lossky's Chapter in Mystical Theology of the Eastern Church dedicated to the Essence and Energies distinction
International Conference on the Philosophy and Theology of St Gregory Palamas, 7–15 March 2012, with links to on line material from the Conference

Further reading 

 

Eastern Orthodox theology
Hesychasm
Conceptual distinctions
Trinitarianism
Panentheism
Palamism
Nature of Jesus Christ